Nord 401 to 436, renumbered to Nord 2.401 to 2.436 in 1872, were 0-4-6T Engerth locomotives for mixed traffic of the Chemins de Fer du Nord.
The machines were built in 1856–1857 and retired from service in the early 1900s.

Construction history

The machines were built by Maschinenfabrik Esslingen (Emil Kessler), Charbonnier et Cie. (successors to the business of ), and Nord's works at La Chapelle in 1856–1857.
The locomotives were 0-4-6T Engerth locomotives for mixed traffic.
The Stephenson valve gear and the cylinders were on the inside of the locomotive frame.

Twelve machines were rebuilt as 0-4-2 tender locomotives between 1873 and 1878 at Nord (La Chapelle).

Service history
The machines were used for mixed service on many of the main and secondary lines of the Nord network.
In 1904 there were still 15 machines remaining in service, Nord 2.401, 2.406, 2.408, 2.409, 2.410, 2.411, 2.412, 2.413, 2.415, 2.418, 2.425, 2.426, 2.430, 2.433, and 2.434.

References

Bibliography

External links
 ETH-Bibliothek Zürich, Bildarchiv. Nord 2.422, viewer

Steam locomotives of France
401
0-4-6T locomotives
Railway locomotives introduced in 1856
Engerth locomotives
Esslingen locomotives